Choron may refer to:
 Choron string drum from the middle ages
 Choroń, village in Poland
 Choron (dance)
 Professeur Choron, French writer and publisher
 Alexandre-Étienne Choron, French musician
 Alexandre Étienne Choron, French chef and inventor of 
 Choron sauce